Ngqushwa Local Municipality is an administrative area in the Amatole District of the Eastern Cape in South Africa.

Main places
The 2001 census divided the municipality into the following main places:

Politics 

The municipal council consists of twenty-three members elected by mixed-member proportional representation. Twelve councillors are elected by first-past-the-post voting in twelve wards, while the remaining eleven are chosen from party lists so that the total number of party representatives is proportional to the number of votes received. In the election of 1 November 2021 the African National Congress (ANC) won a majority of eighteen seats on the council.
The following table shows the results of the election.

References

External links
 http://www.ngqushwamun.gov.za/

Local municipalities of the Amatole District Municipality